Ourselves Alone (released in the US as River of Unrest) is a 1936 British drama film depicting a love story set against the backdrop of the Irish War of Independence. The title is a translation of the Irish slogan Sinn Féin Amháin. It is directed by Brian Desmond Hurst and stars John Lodge, John Loder and Antoinette Cellier.

The film was banned in Northern Ireland under the Civil Authorities (Special Powers) Act (Northern Ireland) 1922, but was shown in the Irish Free State and in Great Britain.

Synopsis

The film opens in 1921 with an IRA ambush of a police convoy carrying two captured members of the IRA. Irish Police Inspector Hannay (John Lodge) and British Captain Wiltshire of the Royal Intelligence Corps (John Loder) both turn out to be in love with Maureen Elliot (Antionette Cellier), a sister of the IRA leader. The IRA leader is subsequently shot by Wiltshire. Hannay realises that Maureen is in love with Wiltshire and, as a final gesture, takes the blame for shooting her brother himself. Maureen then helps Captain Wiltshire to escape an IRA trap.

Cast
 John Lodge as Inspector Hanney
 John Loder as Capt. Wiltshire
 Antoinette Cellier as Maureen Elliott
 Niall MacGinnis as Terence Elliott
 Clifford Evans as Commander Connolly
 Jerry Verno as Private Parsley
 Bruce Lester as 2nd Lt. Lingard
 Maire O'Neill as Nanny
 Tony Quinn as Maloney
 Paul Farrell as Hogan

Reception
One of the earliest reviews (on 10 May 1936) identifies this film as director, Brian Desmond Hurst's breakthrough film, under the banner headline Hitchcock... Capra.... Desmond-Hurst " on B.I.P's "little heard of" 'Ourselves Alone' it states "Remarkably little publicity concerning this production has reached the public, but among those concerned in the business (this time I won't say 'racket') whispers have gone round, like they often do, that it would be worth watching. That whisper should become a shout."

A reviewer in the Irish Times (17 August 1936) under the heading 'Film of the year' stated "If there was any betting on film results I would like to have a little flutter on Ourselves Alone".

Novelist Graham Greene, then film reviewer for The Spectator, noted in July 1936 that this film had been favourably compared to The Informer (1935) by other critics, but dissented from this opinion himself. "One of the silliest pictures which even an English studio has yet managed to turn out", he wrote.

The film was voted the seventh best British movie of 1936.

Books
Theirs is the Glory: Arnhem, Hurst and Conflict on Film takes Hurst's Battle of Arnhem epic as its centrepiece and then chronicles Hurst's life and experiences during the First World War and profiles each of his other nine films on conflict, including Ourselves Alone.

References

External links
 
 
 Official legacy website of the director with filmography including Ourselves Alone

1936 films
1936 romantic drama films
Irish War of Independence films
Films shot at British International Pictures Studios
British black-and-white films
Films directed by Brian Desmond Hurst
Films set in Ireland
British romantic drama films
Films about the Irish Republican Army
1930s English-language films
1930s British films